George Clare may refer to:

 George Adam Clare (1854–1915), Canadian businessman, manufacturer and politician in Preston, Ontario
 George Clare (writer) (1920–2009), British Jewish author who wrote Last Waltz in Vienna
 George William Burdett Clare (1889–1917), English recipient of the Victoria Cross